John D. Wiemann is an American politician in the Missouri House of Representatives, elected in November 2014 to represent District 103, and is a member of the Republican Party. Since 2019, he serves as the Speaker pro tempore of the Missouri House of Representatives.

Election results

State Representative

References

External links
 Campaign website
 
 

1967 births
21st-century American politicians
Living people
People from O'Fallon, Missouri
Republican Party members of the Missouri House of Representatives